Samuel Francis Coleman (September 4, 1842 – May 1, 1898) was an American politician who served in the Virginia House of Delegates.

References

External links 

1842 births
1898 deaths
Democratic Party members of the Virginia House of Delegates
19th-century American politicians